Alofa Dawn Latafale Auva'a, better known as Latafale Auva'a is a Samoan-New Zealand beauty pageant titleholder. She is the first woman to hold four Pacific regional titles by winning Miss Samoa New Zealand 2014, Miss Samoa 2014, Miss Pacific Islands 2014 and Miss World Samoa 2015.

Early life
Auva'a was born in Papakura, New Zealand to a Samoan father and English mother. She graduated from King's College as Deputy Head and also received the University of Auckland's Top Pacific Chancellor Award. Auva'a opted to attend the University of Otago where she studied both Law and Music.

Personal life
In 2018, Auva'a was bestowed a Samoan chief (Matai) title at a ceremony in Vaitele, Samoa. She is also a barrister and solicitor in New Zealand.

References

External links
Miss Samoa Pageant

1993 births
Living people
Miss World 2015 delegates
Samoan beauty pageant winners
New Zealand people of Samoan descent